Refika Birgül (May 19, 1980, Istanbul) is a food writer and television presenter. She is both the weekly food columnist of Refika’nın Mutfağı (Refika’s Kitchen) for Turkey's Hürriyet Daily News newspaper as well as the cooking program host of Mucize Lezzetler (Miracle Tastes). She hosts YouTube cooking channels in Turkish and English. 

In 2010, Birgül published her first bilingual cookbook Refika’nın Mutfağı/Cooking New Istanbul Style.

Early life 
Birgül was born in Istanbul into a large family dominated by medical professionals. Her mother is a Turkish Cypriot who is a native of Cyprus, and her father a native of Nevşehir. She was diagnosed with dyslexia at a young age; however, she exhibited a talent for adding large sums in her head, leading to a lifelong passion for mathematics (alongside black-and-white photography).

Birgül completed her undergraduate studies at Robert College, and has since studied psychology at Koç University and leadership education at London Business School.

Work experience 

 While working at Yavuz Turgul’s advertising agency Medina Turgul, Birgül decided to leave the school for her dream of being an advertiser. 
 Because of the massive earthquake in Istanbul set her on a different path and she started her own business using VoIP (voice over internet protocol).
 After graduation, she worked at IF Istanbul Independent Film Festival and at the organization department of Istanbul Foundation for Culture and Arts (IKSV). After that, she worked as a senior executive and general manager in private Doğan Hospital for five and a half years.
 In 2010, she started a new journey by going with her intuition and established ‘’Refika's Kitchen’’.

Relationship with the kitchen 
Her relationship with cooking started with making foamy Turkish coffee for the whole family when she was as tall as the oven. She learned the Mediterranean cuisine from her Cypriot mother, aunt and uncles and Central Anatolia cuisine from her father, grandfather, father’s sister and aunts-in-law, who are from Nevşehir. Her palate got better during her visits to her relatives in London. She always looks for different things and when she cannot find any, she wants to do it herself. She tried to figure out the algorithm of foods with her love of mathematics. In one of her interviews, she said "I believe that some people are born to love. I am one of them. In fact, cooking is a simplistic realisation of the act of showing this love". The fact that she thinks that even a nice view can be made edible is an indication of this passion of hers.

Refika’s greatest dream in her own words is "to see a French person casually making lahmacun in their home", continuing to create new recipes by conserving the traditions of the culture of Turkish cuisine and also to push the envelope. She is sharing recipes on food and life.

Refika’s Kitchen Studio 
Refika lives in Kuzguncuk neighbourhood of Istanbul. Upon the publication of her book, she needed a studio that suits this spirit. Therefore she initiated a long-term renovation in the building that has been idle for 30 years and was built by the Greek architect Simotas in Kuzguncuk. There, she created her own dream kitchen studio with the name Refika’nın Mutfağı. A mecca for foodies in no small part due to Refika’s efforts, the picturesque Istanbul neighborhood of Kuzguncuk became her living and working headquarters. Her local butcher, baker, and grocer are regulars on her TV show. As of 2020, Refika’nın Mutfağı, Börek Productions, Refika’dan and the Refika’s Kitchen global YouTube channels are still continuing their activities there.

TV show 
In October 2011, she started presenting the show Mucize Lezzetler, which was sponsored by Arçelik in her kitchen studio in Kuzguncuk. The show is being broadcast on the weekends on NTV & Star TV, which is one of the most important national TV channels of Turkey. The fact that each show has a different concept, and that the Turkish cuisine is used in a local and natural way without any limitations make it stand out among other food shows.

In 2015, upon the release of ‘Refika ile Hızlı Tarifler’ where she shared both delicious and very practical recipes with the audience in 10 minutes, she was awarded the Best Food Program of the Year by the Future of Tourism Platform.

In 2018, she created a brand new and different concept called ‘Refika ile Öze Dönüş’ on Fox TV and 24Kitchen. With this program, she aims to go back to her roots, to convey the materials, dishes and techniques of our country's rich cuisine to our viewers and values. She also describes that many flavours will enrich what people eat through our forgotten roots, values and traditions.

While she was working as a hospital manager, her friends encouraged her to write a cookery book. The book was completed in pockets of time snatched from an overloaded and stressful business life. Refika’nın Mutfağı / Cooking New Istanbul Style was published in April 2010 in English and Turkish. The first print run sold out in 1,5 months. In 2011, New York MoMA (Museum of Modern Art) Destination: İstanbul exhibition chose the book to go on sale in MoMA and Refika made it to New York for the first time to present it.

‘Bulgur’un Halleri’ was written by Nursen Doğan and about different ways of cooking bulgur published by Boyut is still on shelves today.

In August 2013, ‘Narlı Tarifler’ brought together 24 delicious recipes with pomegranates, the beauty and the fruit of nature. 

In 2015, ‘Hızlı Tarifler’ which was the written version of the TV show and the recipes there was published. With this book, she aimed to bring everyone who does not cook for a variety of reasons in the kitchen, and to tell them how to enjoy cooking and simple cooking in the house.

In 2016, ‘Düdüklünün Sihirleri’ as published. This book has practical and delicious recipes and aims to break from the prejudices. With the pressure cooker, she offers delicious recipes that prove that all tastes can be cooked from main course to dessert.

Refika's Cookery School & Refika’s Kitchen — Youtube Channels 
As of December 2022, Refika’s youtube channel has reached over 2.3 Million subscribers in 5 years through Refika's Cookery School. The mission of the channel is that everyone can reach the Türkiye (Turkey) Cookery School as free to share any information needed in the kitchen.

Bibliography 
 
Refika’dan Hızlı Tarifler
Narlı Tarifler
Refika’dan Düdüklünün Sihirleri
Bulgurun Halleri - Başlangıçlardan Tatlılara Bulgurlu Tarifler

References 

 Excess Baggage, Istanbul, BBC Radio, 27.08.2011
 Hülya Ekşigil, Mahçup Bir Yıldız Doğuyor, Milliyet Sanat, 01.06.2010 (in Turkish)

External links 
Refika's Kitchen Official Web Site 

1980 births
Turkish people of Cypriot descent
Writers from Istanbul
Robert College alumni
Koç University alumni
Alumni of London Business School
Turkish food writers
Turkish television presenters
Living people
Hürriyet people